Roget's Thesaurus is a widely used English-language thesaurus, created in 1805 by Peter Mark Roget (1779–1869), British physician, natural theologian and lexicographer.

History 
It was released to the public on 29 April 1852. Roget was inspired by the Utilitarian teachings of Jeremy Bentham and wished to help "those who are painfully groping their way and struggling with the difficulties of composition  this work processes to  hold out a helping hand". The Karpeles Library Museum houses the original manuscript in its collection.

Roget's schema of classes and their subdivisions is based on the philosophical work of Leibniz (see ), itself following a long tradition of epistemological work starting with Aristotle. Some of Aristotle's Categories are included in Roget's first class, "abstract relations".

Content 
Roget described his thesaurus in the foreword to the first edition:

Roget's Thesaurus is composed of six primary classes. Each class is composed of multiple divisions and then sections. This may be conceptualized as a tree containing over a thousand branches for individual "meaning clusters" or semantically linked words. Although these words are not strictly synonyms, they can be viewed as colours or connotations of a meaning or as a spectrum of a concept. One of the most general words is chosen to typify the spectrum as its headword, which labels the whole group.

Editions 
The original edition had 15,000 words and each successive edition has been larger,  with the most recent edition (the eighth) containing 443,000 words. The book is updated regularly and each edition is heralded as a gauge to contemporary terms; but each edition keeps true to the original classifications established by Roget. The name "Roget" is trademarked in parts of the world, such as the United Kingdom.  By itself, it is not protected in the United States, where use of the name "Roget" in the title of a thesaurus does not necessarily indicate any relationship to Roget directly; it has come to be seen as a generic thesaurus name.

See also 
 Moby Thesaurus

References

Bibliography

External links 

 
 Roget's Thesaurus: The Original Manuscript at Karpeles Manuscript Library
 Searchable 1911 version hosted by the University of Chicago
 Roget's Thesaurus at Project Gutenberg
 Roget's Hyperlinked Thesaurus - (No longer maintained)

 ROGETS THESAURUS, encyclopedia.com
 Peter Mark Roget, britannica.com
 The Remarkable Roget's Thesaurus, merriam-webster.com

1852 books
Classification systems
Lexicography
Thesauri (lexicography)